Stadionul Victoria is a multi-use stadium in Carei, Romania. It is used mostly for football matches and is the home ground of Victoria Carei. The stadium holds 4,000 people, but only 400 on seats. The stadium was renovated most recently in 2022, when 400 seats were added.

References

Football venues in Romania
Buildings and structures in Satu Mare County